Saint-Ouen may refer to:

 Saint Ouen, a Catholic and Orthodox saint

Places

France
Saint-Ouen is the name of several communes in France:

 Saint-Ouen, Loir-et-Cher, in the Loir-et-Cher département
 Saint-Ouen, Somme, in the Somme département 

It is also part of the name of several communes:

 Saint-Ouen-d'Attez, in the Eure département 
 Saint-Ouen-d'Aunis, in the Charente-Maritime département 
 Saint-Ouen-de-la-Cour, in the Orne département 
 Saint-Ouen-de-Mimbré, in the Sarthe département 
 Saint-Ouen-de-Pontcheuil, in the Eure département 
 Saint-Ouen-des-Alleux, in the Ille-et-Vilaine département 
 Saint Ouen des Besaces, in the Calvados département 
 Saint-Ouen-des-Champs, in the Eure département 
 Saint-Ouen-de-Sécherouvre, in the Orne département 
 Saint-Ouën-des-Toits, in the Mayenne département 
 Saint-Ouën-des-Vallons, in the Mayenne département 
 Saint-Ouen-de-Thouberville, in the Eure département 
 Saint-Ouen-Domprot, in the Marne département 
 Saint-Ouen-du-Breuil, in the Seine-Maritime département 
 Saint-Ouen-du-Mesnil-Oger, in the Calvados département 
 Saint-Ouen-du-Tilleul, in the Eure département 
 Saint-Ouen-en-Belin, in the Sarthe département 
 Saint-Ouen-en-Brie, in the Seine-et-Marne département 
 Saint-Ouen-en-Champagne, in the Sarthe département 
 Saint-Ouen-la-Rouërie, in the Ille-et-Vilaine département 
 Saint-Ouen-la-Thène, in the Charente-Maritime département
 Saint-Ouen-l'Aumône, in the Val-d'Oise département 
 Saint-Ouen-le-Brisoult, in the Orne département 
 Saint-Ouen-le-Houx, in the Calvados département 
 Saint-Ouen-le-Mauger, in the Seine-Maritime département 
 Saint-Ouen-le-Pin, in the Calvados département 
 Saint-Ouen-lès-Parey, in the Vosges département 
 Saint-Ouen-les-Vignes, in the Indre-et-Loire département 
 Saint-Ouen-Marchefroy, in the Eure-et-Loir département 
 Saint-Ouen-sous-Bailly, in the Seine-Maritime département 
 Saint-Ouen-sur-Gartempe, in the Haute-Vienne département 
 Saint-Ouen-sur-Iton, in the Orne département 
 Saint-Ouen-sur-Loire, in the Nièvre département 
 Saint-Ouen-sur-Maire, in the Orne département 
 Saint-Ouen-sur-Morin, in the Seine-et-Marne département
 Saint-Ouen-sur-Seine, in the Seine-Saint-Denis département
Basilica of St. Ouen, Rouen, famous for its Gothic architecture and its pipe organ by Aristide Cavaillé-Coll

Jersey
 Saint Ouen, Jersey, a parish
 St. Ouen F.C., a football club in the above parish